Mohammed Khalaf Al Habtoor (born September 30, 1966) is the son of a business magnate, investor and the vice-chairman and CEO of the Al Habtoor Group, an Emirati conglomerate. He was born into one of the largest business families of Dubai.

Biography

Mohammed Khalaf Al Habtoor was born on September 30, 1968 in Dubai to the business tycoon, Khalaf Al Habtoor, the founder of The Al Habtoor Group and the third wealthiest man (according to net worth) in United Arab Emirates. After completing his schooling in Dubai Al Ittihad Private School, Al Mamzar he went to the United States for higher studies. He earned a degree in Hotel and Restaurant Management at the ATI Career Institute and certifications in varied business disciplines at University of Surrey, University of Slough and the Cornell University.

He is CEO and Vice Chairman of Al Habtoor Group LLC. Through the Al Habtoor Group, in 2010 he was developing a number of  themed developments in Dubai, including Al Habtoor City, Al Habtoor Polo Resort & Club, Al Habtoor Business Tower, and Waldorf Astoria Dubai Palm Jumeirah. He has been involved with Habtoor Hotels, Al Habtoor Real Estate, Al Habtoor Publishing, Emirates International Schools, Diamondlease and Al Habtoor Motors.

He has played polo professionally in international tournaments for the Habtoor Polo team. He founded the Dubai Polo Gold Cup in 2009, the highest handicap international polo tournament in the Middle East. Six years later, the Dubai Polo Gold Cup emerged as the biggest tournament in the Middle East.

He is a member of the Khalaf Ahmad Al Habtoor Foundation (KAHF), founded by his father.

See also
 Al Habtoor Tennis Challenge 
 Al Habtoor Motors LLC 
 Habtoor Hospitality

References

External links
 Company website
 Dubai Polo Gold Cup

1968 births
Emirati billionaires
People from Dubai
Living people
Emirati chief executives